On 23 June 2014, a German Eurofighter Typhoon fighter jet and a Learjet 35 business jet participating in a military exercise collided mid-air over Olsberg, North Rhine-Westphalia, Germany. The Learjet subsequently crashed to the ground with the loss of both crew members on board. The Typhoon was damaged but managed to land safely.

Collision
The accident happened at 14:38 CEST (12:38 UTC). Two Eurofighter Typhoons were on exercise with the Learjet in the Elpe-Olsberg area. The Learjet was simulating a civilian airliner that had been hijacked and had broken off radio contact with Air Traffic Control, while the Typhoons were simulating a military response to such a scenario. The lead Typhoon intercepted the Learjet, and as the latter turned to follow it, the two aircraft collided.

The Typhoon aircraft was severely damaged, but was able to land safely at Nörvenich Air Base, near Cologne. The second Typhoon landed at Cologne Bonn Airport.

Aircraft
The first aircraft was a Eurofighter Typhoon, msn GS0070. The aircraft was built in 2012. It was operated by Taktisches Luftwaffengeschwader 31 "Boelcke", Luftwaffe. It was based at Nörvenich Air Base.

The second aircraft was a Learjet 35A, registered D-CGFI, msn 35A-612, which had first flown in 1986.

Investigations
Investigations into the accident were carried out by the General Flugsicherheit der Bundeswehr and the Bundesstelle für Flugunfalluntersuchung (BFU). The cockpit voice recorder and flight data recorder of the Learjet were recovered on the day of the accident, from a site  from the crash site of the aircraft. The data from these devices were published in the BFU's interim report in September. The BFU's final report into the accident was published in August 2015.  It stated that the causes of the accident were:
 Immediate Causes:
 During positioning for the interception, the collision risk due to unexpected manoeuvres of the intercepted  airplane was not sufficiently taken into consideration.
 The Learjet crew did not take into account the risks due to possible limitations of the field of vision and the distraction of using the computer when deciding their task distribution.  Due to insufficient situational awareness during the intervention, the Learjet crew continued the turn with an excessive bank angle despite the loss of visual contact with the Eurofighter flying at the inside  of the turn.
 Systemic Causes:
 The operator had not specified in detail how the crew  should distribute their tasks during Renegade exercises.
 Neither the operator commissioned to conduct the aerial  target demonstration nor the Air Force had sufficiently  described the Renegade training nor had a commensurate  risk analysis been done.

References

BFU

External links

Aviation accidents and incidents in 2014
Accidents and incidents involving the Learjet 45 family
Aviation accidents and incidents in Germany
2014 in Germany
Mid-air collisions
Mid-air collisions involving general aviation aircraft
Mid-air collisions involving military aircraft
21st century in North Rhine-Westphalia